The Barretts of Wimpole Street is a 1930 play by the Dutch/English dramatist Rudolf Besier, based on the romance between Robert Browning and Elizabeth Barrett, and her father's unwillingness to allow them to marry. The play gave actress Katharine Cornell her signature role.

Production

The Barretts of Wimpole Street was Rudolf Besier's only real success as a playwright. It was first staged August 20, 1930, at the Malvern Festival in Malvern, Worcestershire. Directed by Sir Barry Jackson, the production starred  Gwen Ffrangcon-Davies as Elizabeth Barrett Moulton-Barrett and Scott Sunderland as Robert Browning.

Besier then turned to the United States, but was rebuffed by no fewer than 27 producers before the actress Katharine Cornell took a personal interest in the play and had it staged at the Hanna Theatre in Cleveland, Ohio in 1931. The role of Elizabeth Barrett worked so well for Cornell that it became her signature role.

The Barretts of Wimpole Street then went to Broadway, where it opened on February 9, 1931, at the Empire Theatre, starring Katharine Cornell and Brian Aherne. Costumes and scenic design were by Jo Mielziner.  It was revived there in 1934 and 1945.

Original Broadway cast

 Katharine Cornell as Elizabeth Barrett Moulton-Barrett
 Brian Aherne as Robert Browning
 Margaret Barker as Henrietta Moulton-Barrett
 John Buckler as Captain Surtees Cook
 Joyce Carey as Arabel Moulton-Barrett
 Leslie Denison as George Moulton-Barrett
 Vernon Downing as Alfred Moulton-Barrett
 Flush as Flush (Elizabeth's dog)
 Brenda Forbes as Wilson
 John Halloran as Octavius Moulton-Barrett
 Basil Harvey as Henry Moulton-Barrett
 Oswald Marshall as Doctor Ford-Waterlow
 Dorothy Mathews as Bella Hedley
 George Riddell as Doctor Chambers
 John D. Seymour as Henry Bevan
 Frederick Voight as Charles Moulton-Barrett
 Charles Waldron as Edward Moulton-Barrett
 William Whitehead as Septimus Moulton-Barrett

Adaptations

Film

It was filmed in 1934, starring Fredric March, Norma Shearer and Charles Laughton.  That film was remade scene-for-scene and almost shot-for-shot, in colour, in 1957, starring Bill Travers, Jennifer Jones and Sir John Gielgud.  Both films were directed by Sidney Franklin.

Musical
The play also spawned a musical.  It was first set as The Third Kiss by Judge Fred G. Moritt, which was never produced, but that was reworked as Robert and Elizabeth, with music by Ron Grainer.  It opened in London in 1964, starring June Bronhill and Keith Michell.

Television
On April 2, 1956, Producers' Showcase aired a TV production of The Barretts of Wimpole Street featuring Katherine Cornell as Elizabeth Barrett Browning and Margalo Gillmore as Arabel Moulton-Barrett — the roles they had created on Broadway in 1931. This was one of several TV productions of the play done in the US and England between the 1950 and 1961.

A 1982 TV film The Barretts of Wimpole Street was made by the BBC starring Jane Lapotaire, Joss Ackland, Jeremy Brett and Nigel Stock.

Sources

References

External links

 
 

1930 plays
Robert Browning
Biographical plays about writers
Plays by Rudolf Besier